Scurelle (Scurełe in local dialect) is a comune (municipality) in Trentino in the northern Italian region Trentino-Alto Adige/Südtirol, located about  east of Trento.

Scurelle borders the following municipalities: Pieve Tesino, Castello Tesino, Telve, Cinte Tesino, Bieno, Strigno, Spera, Carzano, Villa Agnedo and Castelnuovo.

Demographic evolution

References

External links
 Homepage of the city

Cities and towns in Trentino-Alto Adige/Südtirol